William Conway (1802 – November 30, 1865) was a United States Navy quartermaster born in Camden, Maine. At the surrender of Pensacola Navy Yard (also known as Warrington Navy Yard) to the rebels on January 12, 1861, Confederate Lieutenant Frederick B. Kinshaw ordered Conway to lower the American flag. He replied: "I have served under that flag for forty years, and I won't do it." For his refusal, Conway was arrested and clapped in irons. Shortly afterward he was sent north, where he remained until his death at Brooklyn, New York. For his patriotic action, Conway was presented with a gold medal by citizens of California. In August 1906, the Quartermaster William Conway Monument was unveiled at Camden, a granite boulder affixed with a commemorative bronze plaque "honoring his sturdy loyalty."

Namesakes
 Two destroyers have been named USS Conway in his honor.

References

External links
Dictionary of American Naval Fighting Ships -- USS Conway

1802 births
1865 deaths
Union Navy officers
People from Camden, Maine
People of Maine in the American Civil War
United States Navy sailors